Gaddafi Stadium hosted 40 Test matches, the first of these was in 1959 when Pakistan played the touring Australian side. The ground has also hosted 60 One Day Internationals (ODIs), the first was in 1978 between Pakistan and England.

In cricket, a five-wicket haul (also known as a "five-for" or "fifer") refers to a bowler taking five or more wickets in a single innings. This is regarded as a notable achievement. This list details the five-wicket hauls taken in international cricket at Gaddafi Stadium.

The stadium also maintains an honor board.

Key

Test Match five-wicket hauls

Ten five-wicket hauls have been taken on the ground in Tests.

One Day International five-wicket hauls

Only one five-wicket hauls have been taken on the ground in ODIs.

T20 International five-wicket hauls

Only one five-wicket hauls have been taken on the ground in T20Is.

Notes

References

External links
 Five-wicket hauls at Gaddafi Stadium, CricInfo

Cricket grounds in Pakistan
Gaddafi Stadium
Cricket in Lahore
Lists of Pakistani cricket records and statistics